is a Japanese male track cyclist and professional keirin cyclist. He won the silver medal in the 1 km time trial at the 2016 Asian Cycling Championships.

References

External links
 Profile at cyclingarchives.com

1986 births
Living people
Japanese male cyclists
Place of birth missing (living people)
Keirin cyclists